Sean Julian Danielsen (born February 14, 1982) is an American musician and artistic painter, best known as the guitarist and lead vocalist of American rock bands Smile Empty Soul and World Fire Brigade. In addition to creating one studio album and three independent extended play albums, Danielsen has also collaborated on Noise Refinery (West One Music) compilation album Anger Management with former He Is Legend rhythm guitarist Mitchell Ray Marlow.

History

Early years 
As the son of Jerry Danielsen, recording artist and owner of Busy Signal Studios, Danielsen was born in California.  In the three years leading up to his tenth birthday, Danielsen lived in the midst of a desolate summer camp in Maine. After performing in his first rock band at age 11, Danielsen moved to California midway through his teens to live with his father.

Music career

Smile Empty Soul 
Shortly after moving across the country, Danielsen met percussionist Derek Gledhill and bassist Ryan Martin while attending neighboring high schools in Santa Clarita, California.  It was through this partnership in 1998 that alternative rock band Smile Empty Soul was formed. Shortly after releasing their gold certified eponymous album in early 2003, Danielsen performed on and helped compose "My Father's Daughter", which was released as a track on American rock vocalist Nina Storey's fifth studio album 24 Off the Board.

World Fire Brigade 
In 2009, Danielsen formed rock band World Fire Brigade with Brett Scallions of American rock band Fuel. After working with former Shinedown bassist Brad Stewart, the band recruited music producer Eddie Wohl to play keyboard for the band.  On August 28, 2012, debut album Spreading My Wings, featuring Candiria percussionist Ken Schalk, in addition to guitarists Mike McCready and Rob Caggiano was released via FrostByte Media.

Solo career

Enjoy the Process 
On 16 April 2013, Danielsen released his first solo album, Enjoy the Process.  The EP, produced by Eddie Wohl, featured six acoustic tracks.  The songs used on the album were described by the singer as delicate, low key songs that are best accompanied by light guitar and diverge from tunes typically performed by his first major label band.  After publishing the EP, PureGrainAudio.com released a free copy of "The Breaks", the first song on the album.

Anger Management 
Between the publishing of his first two albums, he worked with former He Is Legend guitarist Mitchell Ray Marlow on "Away" and "Best in You", two songs featured on Anger Management, a compilation album released on February 27, 2014, by West One Music.

Food Chain (EP) 
Danielsen's second solo album, entitled Food Chain, featured a full band and was recorded in Babylon Studios in Van Nuys, California.  Released in November 2014, the album gave Danielsen more flexibility in the music he was able to play.

During late 2014 and early 2015, the vocalist toured the United States in support of his second EP.

In September 2015, Danielsen stated that he plans to publish his next solo EP in late 2016.

Product of Isolation  
In October 2016, Danielsen posted on his Facebook page, that in January 2017, he planned to release Product of Isolation, his first full-length solo studio album.  Early the following month, the singer announced that 13 January 2017 is the planned release date for that work.

Mind Control to Steal the Soul 
In March 2017, the guitarist announced that he plans to release Mind Control to Steal the Soul, his third solo EP, some time in July of that year.  The following month, Danielsen announced the release date as well as potential song titles.

The Best of Sean Danielsen Solo 
In February 2019, the singer released a compilation album entitled The Best of Sean Danielsen Solo, with The Best of Sean Danielsen Solo Material, Vol. 2 arriving two months later.

Discography

Solo career 
 Enjoy the Process (2013)
 Food Chain (2014)
 Product of Isolation (2017)
 Mind Control to Steal the Soul (2017)
 The Best of Sean Danielsen Solo Material (2019)
 The Best of Sean Danielsen Solo Material, Vol. 2 (2019)

World Fire Brigade 
 Spreading My Wings (2012)

Contributions 
 "My Father's Daughter", 24 Off the Board, Nina Storey (Nina Storey Music, 2003)
 "Looking", Deaf Ears, Jerry Danielsen featuring Jake Kilmer (Busy Signal Studios, 2009)
 "Best in You", Anger Management (West One Music, 2014)
 "Away", Anger Management (West One Music, 2014)
 "You Must Like Suffering", The Darkest of Angels, Dead by Wednesday (EMP Label Group, 2016)

Smile Empty Soul

Albums 
 Smile Empty Soul (2003)
 Anxiety (2005)
 Vultures (2006)
 Consciousness (2009)
 3's (2012)
 Chemicals (2013)
 Rarities (2017)
 Oblivion (2018)
 The Acoustic Sessions, volumes 1 and 2 (2020)
 Black Pilled (2021)
 Four Horsemen of the Apocalypse (2023)

Extended play albums 
 Hecklers Veto (1999)
 B-Sides (2008)
 Shapeshifter (2016)
 Sheep(2019)
2020 (2020)
Soft Songs for the Quarantined Mind (2021)
The Loss of Everything (2022)

Contributions 
 "Finding Myself" – Featured on The Punisher: The Album (2004)
 "Who I Am" – Featured on Music from and Inspired by Spider-Man 2 (2004)

Personal life 
In July 2013, he began selling his own paintings via Facebook.

In June 2016, he married his long time partner, that he had been in a relationship with since 2005.

For his entire music career, he has used Schecter electric and acoustic guitars. He also cited Jerry Cantrell and Kim Thayil as his favorite guitarists.
Sean recently has switched from Schecter to Dean and no longer uses Schecter. Sean is an official artist of Dean as per Dean's official website.

References

External links 
 

American rock guitarists
American male guitarists
American male singer-songwriters
American rock singers
American rock songwriters
Alternative metal singers
Nu metal singers
Singers from Los Angeles
1982 births
Living people
Guitarists from Los Angeles
21st-century American singers
21st-century American guitarists
21st-century American male singers
Singer-songwriters from California